Dusie began in 2005 by publishing an experimental poetics journal online. In 2006, the magazine began publishing full-length works in paperback format. Dusie's full-length collections include poetry books by Joe Ross, Anne Blonstein, Kristy Bowen, jenn mccreary, Nicole Mauro, Logan Ryan Smith, Danielle Pafunda, Arielle Guy, Sreyash Sarkar, Laynie Browne and Elizabeth Treadwell.

Dusie is also a yearly poetry publishing kollektiv. Under the auspices of Dusie Press, poets participate both physically and virtually in communal projects. Poets in the Dusie Kollektiv write, design, produce and distribute poetic chapbooks in limited, signed editions of 50 to 150 copies. The poetry kollektiv sets out to enhance poetic risk-taking and experimentation, and was one of the first to publish e-chaps, especially in great numbers. Dusie supports contemporary emerging poets as well as established poets from around the world, unites poetry writing with book-art visions and fosters synergy as well as satellite projects. It makes poetry available to a wider community through free online PDF downloads.

Some works have found their way into rare books and poetry collections, have been showcased at the Poets House in New York and have been featured in established literary journals.

Dusie was a featured press in Poets & Writers November/December 2010 edition.

References

External links
Dusie Press: Online Poetics Journal 

2005 establishments in Switzerland
Magazines established in 2005
Online literary magazines
Poetry literary magazines
Poetry organizations
Literary magazines published in Switzerland